Calvin Reginald "Cal" Snowden (born November 29, 1946) is a former professional American football defensive end in National Football League. He played five seasons for the St. Louis Cardinals, the Buffalo Bills, and the San Diego Chargers.

References

1946 births
Living people
American football defensive ends
Buffalo Bills players
Indiana Hoosiers football players
San Diego Chargers players
St. Louis Cardinals (football) players
Players of American football from Washington, D.C.